In 18th century Britain, the Paymaster of Pensions was the official in charge of payments of Crown pensions and bounties. The first paymaster was Edward Nicholas in 1703, and the post was abolished in 1782 by the Civil List and Secret Service Money Act 1782 (22 Geo. III, c. 82).

List of Paymasters of Pensions
1703–1707 Edward Nicholas
1707–1713 Hon. Spencer Compton
1713–1715 Edward Nicholas
1715 (August–September) Edward Godfrey
1715–1718 William Clayton
1718–1731 Walter Chetwynd
1731–1742 William Stewart
1742–1744 Edward Hooper
1744–1745 Benjamin Keene
1745–1755 Hon. Charles Compton
1755–1763 William Hall Gage, 2nd Viscount Gage
1763–1765 Richard Neville
1765–1782 William Hall Gage, 2nd Viscount Gage

External links
Institute of Historical Research

1703 establishments in England
1782 disestablishments in Great Britain
History of the British Isles
Pensions